This article lists the squads for the 2011 UEFA European Under-21 Championship.  Only players born on or after 1 January 1988 were eligible to play.

Each participating national association had to submit a list of up to forty players to the UEFA administration on or before 12 May 2011. No further changes could be made to this list after this deadline. At least four of these forty players had to be goalkeepers.

Only 23 of the forty players listed were authorised to take part in the final tournament. A list of these 23 players had to be in the possession of the UEFA administration on or before 1 June 2011. Three of these 23 players had to be goalkeepers.

Players in boldface have been capped at full international level at some point in their career.

Age, caps, goals and club as of 11 June 2011.

Group A

Head coach: Georgi Kondratiev

Head coach: Keld Bordinggaard

Head coach: Eyjólfur Sverrisson

Head coach: Pierluigi Tami

Group B

Czech Republic
Head coach: Jakub Dovalil

England
Head coach: Stuart Pearce

Spain
Head coach: Luis Milla

Ukraine
Head coach: Pavlo Yakovenko

Player statistics
Player representation by club

Player representation by league

The Ukrainian squad were made up entirely of players from the respective countries' domestic leagues. Altogether, there were eighteen national leagues that had players in the tournament.

Average age of squads

Notes

References

Squads
UEFA European Under-21 Championship squads